Frank Barton (birth unknown – death unknown) was an English professional rugby league footballer who played in the 1940s and 1950s.

Playing career

International honours
Frank Barton won caps for England while at Wigan in 1951 against Other Nationalities, in 1952 against Other Nationalities, won a cap for British Empire XIII while at Wigan in 1952 against New Zealand, and won a cap for Great Britain while at Wigan in 1951 against New Zealand.

Frank Barton also represented Great Britain while at Wigan between 1952 and 1956 against France (1 non-Test match).

Challenge Cup Final appearances
Frank Barton played right-, i.e. number 10, and scored a try in Wigan's 8-3 victory over Bradford Northern in the 1947–48 Challenge Cup Final during the 1947–48 season at Wembley Stadium, London on Saturday 1 May 1948, in front of a crowd of 91,465. and played right- in Barrow's 21-12 victory over Workington Town in the 1954–55 Challenge Cup Final during the 1954–55 season at Wembley Stadium, London on Saturday 30 April 1955, in front of a crowd of 66,513.

County Cup Final appearances
Frank Barton played right-, i.e. number 12, in Wigan's 3-7 defeat by Widnes in the 1945–46 Lancashire County Cup Final during the 1945–46 season at Wilderspool Stadium, Warrington on Saturday 27 October 1945, played right-, i.e. number 10, in the 14-8 victory over Warrington in the 1948 Lancashire County Cup Final during the 1948–49 season at Station Road, Swinton on Saturday 13 November 1948, played right- in the 20-7 victory over Leigh in the 1949–50 Lancashire County Cup Final during the 1949–50 season at Wilderspool Stadium, Warrington on Saturday 29 October 1949, played right- in the 28-5 victory over Warrington in the 1950–51 Lancashire County Cup Final during the 1950–51 season at Station Road, Swinton on Saturday 4 November 1950, played right- in the 14-6 victory over Leigh in the 1951–52 Lancashire County Cup Final during the 1951–52 season at Station Road, Swinton on Saturday 27 October 1951, and played right-, i.e. number 10, in Barrow's 12-2 victory over Oldham in the 1954–55 Lancashire County Cup Final during the 1954–55 season at Station Road, Swinton on Saturday 23 October 1954.

References

External links
Statistics at wigan.rlfans.com
(archived by web.archive.org) Back on the Wembley trail

Barrow Raiders players
British Empire rugby league team players
England national rugby league team players
English rugby league players
Great Britain national rugby league team players
Lancashire rugby league team players
Place of birth missing
Place of death missing
Rugby league hookers
Rugby league props
Wigan Warriors players
Year of birth missing
Year of death missing